Jan Ekström (born 11 October 1937) is a Swedish former footballer who played as a midfielder.

References

Association football midfielders
Swedish footballers
Sweden international footballers
Allsvenskan players
Malmö FF players
1937 births
Living people